Ago Markvardt (born 11 August 1969 in Elva) is a retired Estonian nordic combined skier who competed from 1989 to 1998. At the 1994 Winter Olympics in Lillehammer, he finished fifth in the 15 km individual and fourth in the 3 x 10 km team events.

Markvardt finished fourth in the 15 km individual event at the 1997 FIS Nordic World Ski Championships in Trondheim. His best World Cup finish was eighth twice in the 15 km individual event (1994, 1997).

A three-time Olympian Markvardt's only career victory was in a World Cup B 15 km individual event in Germany in 1996.

He is well-respected guest commentator of Nordic combined sports events on Estonian Television.

Personal
He has two daughters: Margaret and Keira Olivia.

References

External links
 
 
 
 

1969 births
Living people
People from Elva, Estonia
Nordic combined skiers at the 1992 Winter Olympics
Nordic combined skiers at the 1994 Winter Olympics
Nordic combined skiers at the 1998 Winter Olympics
Estonian male Nordic combined skiers
Olympic Nordic combined skiers of Estonia